Zoological Studies is a peer-reviewed open access scientific journal covering zoology, with focuses on animal behavior, comparative physiology, evolution, ecology, systematics and biogeography. It is published by the Biodiversity Research Center, Academia Sinica, Taiwan. The editor-in-chief is Benny K.K. Chan. It was established in 1962 as the Bulletin of the Institute of Zoology, Academia Sinica, receiving its current title in 1994.

Abstracting and indexing
The journal is abstracted and indexed in:

According to the Journal Citation Reports, the journal has a 2020 impact factor of 2.058.

References

External links
 

English-language journals
Zoology journals
Creative Commons Attribution-licensed journals
Academic journals of Taiwan
Academia Sinica